Anna Mazzotta is a British visual artist of Italian descent. She is best known for her paintings and charcoal drawings, based on observations of life, revivalist glamour underpinned by humour which is often bittersweet.

Career
Mazzotta was born in Swindon, Wiltshire.  She studied Fine Art at the Wimbledon College of Arts from 1989 to 1992, where she gained a First Class Honours Degree and afterwards, from 1992 to 1994, earned her Masters at the Royal College of Art under the tutelage of Paula Rego, John Bellany and Ken Kiff. Her work was included in the 1994 exhibition Five RCA Painters at the Paton Gallery.

Critics note that her art has a depth of narrative that makes her work unique with a distinctive style that is instantly recognisable. Mazzotta's style imitates vaudeville entertainment. Her work has been inspired by expressionism, the city of Weimar, and cinema. She lives and works in Bristol and London, England.

Mazzotta's solo exhibitions have been at Beaux Art in Bath, Gallery 19 in London, GX Gallery in London, Innocent Fine Art in Bristol, and A&D Gallery in London. She has done private commissions for Jane Fonda and Norman Cook.

Honours and awards 
 Jerwood Drawing Prize: Major Award Winner
 Society of Women Artists: Great Art Winner
 Susan Kasan Summer Fellowship, USA

References

External links
 

1970 births
Living people
21st-century English painters
21st-century English women artists
Alumni of the Royal College of Art
Alumni of Wimbledon College of Arts
English women painters
People from Swindon